The Honda CBR125R is a CBR series  single-cylinder sport bike made by Honda. The CBR125R first appeared on the market in 2004. It is manufactured in Thailand by A.P. Honda alongside the similarly designed CBR150R, which is primarily aimed for the Far East market.

It has the smallest displacement engine of any CBR motorcycle.



History 
The CBR125R was introduced in 2004 by Honda to fill in a gap in the 125 cc market left by the discontinued NSR125.

2004–2006 

The models produced during these years resemble the CBR600F4i and used a carburettor in the fuel system. The Repsol color scheme was introduced in 2005 and remained for the following year only as the CBR125RS5/6.

2007–2010 

In 2007, the CBR125R received some major changes. This model got different front fairings to resemble the look of the CBR600RR as well as colour changes to the swingarm and front telescopic fork which are now black. Engine changes included the implementation of PGM-FI fuel injection system, IACV (Idle Air Control Valve) which operates alongside the PGM-FI, and HECS3 oxygen sensor to comply with EURO3 standards.

2011–2016 

In 2011, the CBR125R received the first major overhaul since its inception, bringing its looks in line with the 2011 CBR250R, which in turn borrows from VFR1200F sports tourer.

Specifications

References

External links 

 2007 Honda CBR125R official Honda Canada page for the 2007 model

CBR125R
Sport bikes
Motorcycles introduced in 2004